Grigorije II of Ras (c. 1250 – 1321), was a Serbian medieval monk-scribe whose writing flourished from 1282 to 1321. He is now venerated as a saint.
 
The Serbian Orthodox Church celebrates Grigorije as a saint during the holiday of the Assembly of the Holy Serbian Enlighteners and Teachers on 30 August (Julian Calendar) or 12 September (Gregorian Calendar). Monk of the Hilandar monastery and eventually bishop of Ras, he bore a name already made famous by earlier scribes in that institution's century-long history as a center of Serbian book production. He died in 1321, leaving behind a legacy of elegant, illuminated volumes whose survivor spanned almost four decades (1282 to 1321).

He completed transcribing the Church Law Code (Nomocanon) known as the "Raška krmčija" at Ras in 1305. The manuscript, though preserved in its entirety, is divided physically and is kept in Moscow today, in the State Historical Museum and in the Russian State Library. Grigorije of Ras is also known for the verses he composed on a silver cross which he made together with King Stefan Milutin.

See also
 List of Serbian saints
 Medieval Serbian literature

References 

1250 births
1321 deaths
Serbian monks
Serbian saints of the Eastern Orthodox Church